Roșia may refer to several places in Romania:

 Roșia, Bihor, a commune in Bihor County
 Roșia, Sibiu, a commune in Sibiu County
 Roșia, a village in Dieci Commune, Arad County
 Roșia, a village in Balșa Commune, Hunedoara County
 Roșia, a village in Căzănești Commune, Mehedinți County
 Roșia, a village in Alunu Commune, Vâlcea County
 Roșia Nouă, a village in Petriș Commune, Arad County
 Roșia-Jiu, a village in Fărcășești Commune, Gorj County
 Roșia Montană, a commune in Alba County
 Roșia Nouă, a village in Petriș Commune, Arad County

See also 
 Roșu (disambiguation)
 Roșieni (disambiguation)
 Roșiori (disambiguation)
 Roșioara (disambiguation)